Russalpia albertisi, the Tassie Hopper, is a species of short-horned grasshopper in the family Acrididae. It is found in Tasmania, Australia.

References

External links

 

Catantopinae
Fauna of Tasmania